Vancouver-Langara is a provincial electoral district for the Legislative Assembly of British Columbia, Canada.

History 
This riding has elected the following Members of Legislative Assembly:

1999 Redistribution 
Changes to the Vancouver-Langara electoral district in 1999 include:
Addition of the area bounded by 33rd and 41st Avenues, and Main and Granville Streets
Removal of the area bounded by Granville Street, 41st Avenue, 57th Avenue, and the Arbutus rail line

Member of Legislative Assembly 
This riding is currently held by MLA Michael Lee, who was elected in the 2017 Provincial General Election. He represents the British Columbia Liberal Party.

From 2009-2017, the riding was held by Moira Stilwell, who represented the British Columbia Liberal Party as well. Stilwell was appointed Minister of Advanced Education and Labour Market Development in June 2009. Previously, the MLA was Carole Taylor, former chair of the CBC and former Vancouver City Councillor. She was first elected in 2005 and appointed the Minister of Finance. She represented the British Columbia Liberal Party. She resigned on December 18, 2008.

Election results 

|-

|-

|NDP
|Anita Romaniuk
|align="right"|6,456
|align="right"|32.65
|align="right"|
|align="right"|$9,044

|- bgcolor="white"
!align="right" colspan=3|Total Valid Votes
!align="right"| 19,77
!align="right"|100
!align="right"|
|- bgcolor="white"
!align="right" colspan=3|Total Rejected Ballots
!align="right"|183
!align="right"|0.93
!align="right"|
|- bgcolor="white"
!align="right" colspan=3|Turnout
!align="right"|19,955
!align="right"|53.51
!align="right"|
|}

|-

|-

|NDP
|Peter G. Prontzos
|align="right"|2,999
|align="right"|17.00%
|align="right"|
|align="right"|$2,596

|Independent
|Joe Young
|align="right"|105
|align="right"|0.60%
|align="right"|
|align="right"|$362

|}

|-

|-

|NDP
|Ragini Rankin
|align="right"|5,515
|align="right"|30.08%
|align="right"|
|align="right"|$29,984

|Natural Law
|Jerry Zen-Jih Chang
|align="right"|89
|align="right"|0.49%
|align="right"|
|align="right"|$118

|}

|-

|NDP
|Peter M. Kendall
|align="right"|6,774
|align="right"|34.57%
|align="right"|
|align="right"|$25,805
|-

|}

References

External links 
Vancouver-Langara Electoral District Map (pdf)
Results of 2013 election (pdf)
Results of 2009 election (pdf)
Results of 2005 election (pdf)
BC Electoral Boundaries Report, 2015 (pdf)

Politics of Vancouver
British Columbia provincial electoral districts
Provincial electoral districts in Greater Vancouver and the Fraser Valley